Antelope was built at Batavia in 1792 and captured in 1797. Captain Thomas Finnan (or Fennan) acquired a letter of marque on 8 May 1798. She sailed from London on 20 May to gather slaves from Africa. She embarked slaves at Anomabu, and was reported off Grenada on her way to Jamaica, having come from Anomabu. Although the registers carried her with stale data for some years, her subsequent fate is currently unknown.

Citations

1792 ships
Captured ships
Age of Sail merchant ships of England
Age of Sail merchant ships of the Dutch Republic
London slave ships